Carry On Behind is a 1975 British comedy film, the 27th release in the series of 31 Carry On films (1958–1992). It was the first entry in the series not to be scripted by Talbot Rothwell since Carry On Cruising 13 years previously. Also missing was series stalwart Sid James. James was busy touring in a play, while Rothwell's health prevented him from writing. The regular actors present are Kenneth Williams, Kenneth Connor, Jack Douglas, Joan Sims and Peter Butterworth, Bernard Bresslaw and Patsy Rowlands. Carry On Behind was the final picture in the series for Bresslaw (in his 14th appearance), Liz Fraser (in her fourth) and Rowlands (in her ninth) as well as Carol Hawkins (in her second). It saw the only appearances of Elke Sommer, Adrienne Posta, Sherrie Hewson and Ian Lavender in a Carry On film, and was the first of two entries in the series for Windsor Davies.

Plot
Frustrated butcher Fred Ramsden (Windsor Davies) and his dim electrician friend Ernie Bragg (Jack Douglas) happily head off for a holiday trip at the Riverside Caravan Site, while their respective wives Sylvia (Liz Fraser) and Vera (Patricia Franklin) look forward to their health farm holiday. Once at the caravan site of Major Leap (Kenneth Connor), Fred starts making eyes at two young female campers, Carol (Sherrie Hewson) and Sandra (Carol Hawkins). However, as Ernie talks in his sleep and any infidelities are likely to be spoken of in the marital bed after their holiday, Fred is despondent. Professor Roland Crump (Kenneth Williams) teams with Roman expert Anna Vrooshka (Elke Sommer) in an archaeological dig at the site. Arthur Upmore (Bernard Bresslaw) and his wife Linda (Patsy Rowlands) are saddled with her mother Daphne (Joan Sims) and her vulgar mynah bird. Arthur is caught in a compromising position with attractive blonde Norma Baxter (Adrienne Posta) whose husband Joe (Ian Lavender) is lumbered with their giant Irish wolfhound.

After a few drinks with the amused pub landlord (David Lodge), Fred and Ernie discover that the caravan site is riddled with excavation holes. Daphne is perturbed by the discovery that her estranged husband Henry Barnes (Peter Butterworth) lives a downtrodden life as the camp's odd-job man, despite having won the pools. Major Leap is determined to give the place a boost and arranges an evening cabaret for the caravanners, but a mix-up over the phone secures a stripper, Veronica (Jenny Cox), rather than the singer he wanted. Carol and Sandra having hooked up with archaeology students Bob (Brian Osborne) and Clive (Larry Dann), Fred and Ernie pick up Maureen (Diana Darvey) and Sally (Georgina Moon), two beautiful young women from the village. Some wet paint, some glue, heavy rain that causes the tunnels of the dig to collapse, and the arrival of their wives soon bring their planned night of passion to a halt.

Casting
The main roles are played by Carry On regulars Kenneth Williams, Bernard Bresslaw, Peter Butterworth, Joan Sims, Kenneth Connor, Jack Douglas and Patsy Rowlands. Newcomers to the series in major roles are Windsor Davies and Elke Sommer. Sims played the role of Rowlands's mother, despite being only eight months older than her on-screen daughter.

Supporting roles are played by Sherrie Hewson, Carol Hawkins, Ian Lavender, Adrienne Posta, George Layton, Larry Dann, Larry Martyn and David Lodge. These supporting players were mostly recognisable comedy actors at the time, but not long-term regular members of the Carry On team. Liz Fraser had appeared in three early films in the series; her re-appearance here was after a gap of twelve years.

This was the last Carry On film for Bernard Bresslaw and Patsy Rowlands. By this time Sid James, Terry Scott, Hattie Jacques and Charles Hawtrey had already made their final Carry On film appearances.

Filming
Chilly spring filming meant the bare trees, muddy fields and icy breath are all quite visible, although the setting is a summer caravanning holiday. A similar dilemma met the cast and crew in Carry On Camping. The signage in Fred Ramsden's butcher's shop clearly shows that the shop is closing for the Easter holidays, which can occur as early as March.

Whilst this film was in production, Bernard Bresslaw and Joan Sims also appeared in One of Our Dinosaurs Is Missing, another film being made at Pinewood Studios alongside Carry On Behind.

Cast

Kenneth Williams as Professor Roland Crump
Elke Sommer as Professor Anna Vooshka
Bernard Bresslaw as Arthur Upmore
Kenneth Connor as Major Leap
Jack Douglas as Ernie Bragg
Joan Sims as Daphne Barnes
Windsor Davies as Fred Ramsden
Peter Butterworth as Henry Barnes
Liz Fraser as Sylvia Ramsden
Patsy Rowlands as Linda Upmore
Ian Lavender as Joe Baxter
Adrienne Posta as Norma Baxter
Patricia Franklin as Vera Bragg
Donald Hewlett as Dean
Carol Hawkins as Sandra
Sherrie Hewson as Carol
David Lodge as Landlord
Marianne Stone as Mrs Elsie Rowan
George Layton as Doctor
Brian Osborne as Bob
Larry Dann as Clive
Georgina Moon as Sally
Diana Darvey as Maureen
Jenny Cox as Veronica
Larry Martyn as Electrician
Linda Hooks as Nurse
Kenneth Waller as Barman
Billy Cornelius as Man with salad
Melita Manger as Woman with salad
Hugh Futcher as Painter
Helli Louise as Stripper
Jeremy Connor as Student with ice cream
Alexandra Dane as Lady in low-cut dress
Sam Kelly as Projectionist (uncredited)
Johnny Briggs as Plasterer (uncredited)
Lucy Griffiths as Lady with hat (uncredited)
Stanley McGeagh as Short-sighted man (uncredited)
Brenda Cowling as Wife (uncredited)
Sidney Johnson as Man in glasses (uncredited)
Drina Pavlovic as Courting girl (uncredited)
Caroline Whitaker as Student (uncredited)
Ray Edwards as Man with water (uncredited)

Filming and locations

Filming dates – 10 March–18 April 1975

Interiors:
 Pinewood Studios, Buckinghamshire

Exteriors:
 Pinewood Studios: the Orchard doubled for the caravan site, as it had for the campsite in Carry On Camping.
 Maidenhead, Berkshire : the town hall doubled for the university seen at the start of the film. It had previously been used for the hospital exteriors in Carry On Doctor and Carry On Again Doctor.
 Farnham Royal, Buckinghamshire

References

Bibliography

External links

Carry On Behind at The Whippit Inn
Carry On Behind at Carry On Line

1975 films
1970s sex comedy films
Films about archaeology
British sex comedy films
Behind
1970s English-language films
Films about vacationing
Films directed by Gerald Thomas
Films produced by Peter Rogers
Films shot at Pinewood Studios
Films shot in Berkshire
Films shot in Buckinghamshire
1975 comedy films
1970s British films